Michael Blanchy (born 24 September 1981) is a Belgian former professional road cyclist.

Major results

2002
 1st Internationale Wielertrofee Jong Maar Moedig
 3rd Paris–Roubaix Espoirs
2003
 1st Stages 2 & 3 Tour de Liège
 3rd Hasselt–Spa–Hasselt
 5th 
 8th Zellik–Galmaarden
2004
 4th Brussel–Ingooigem
2005
 Le Triptyque des Monts et Châteaux
1st  Mountains classification
1st Stage 2b
 2nd Omloop van de Vlaamse Scheldeboorden
 2nd Grand Prix de la ville de Pérenchies
 7th Nationale Sluitingprijs
 7th 
 10th Omloop van het Waasland
2006
 1st  Mountains classification, Circuit Franco-Belge
 6th Overall La Tropicale Amissa Bongo
1st Stage 3
 8th Ronde van Noord-Holland
2007
 1st Grand Prix Criquielion
 3rd 
 7th Vlaamse Havenpijl
 8th Omloop van de Vlaamse Scheldeboorden
2009
 5th Omloop van het Waasland
 6th Grand Prix Herning
 9th Rund um Düren

References

External links

Belgian male cyclists
1981 births
Living people
People from Verviers
Cyclists from Liège Province